Meta-moderation is a second level of comment moderation. A user is invited to rate a moderator's decision. He is shown a post that was moderated up or down and marks whether the moderator acted fairly. This is used to improve the quality of moderation.

Slashdot and Kuro5hin are two websites with meta-moderation. The GameFAQs message boards used to have it.

See also 
 Moderation system

References 
 Slashdot Metamoderation FAQ
 Meatball: MedaModeration
 Slash(dot) and Burn: Distributed Moderation in a Large Online Conversation Space Cliff Lampe, Paul Resnick

Groupware
Internet forum terminology
Reputation management
Content moderation